Nguyễn Hữu Hạnh (July 26, 1926 – September 29, 2019) was a Vietnamese military officer of South Vietnam during the Vietnam War, rising to the rank of Brigadier General.

He was also a sympathizer of the National Liberation Front of South Vietnam (NLF), and worked as in intelligence officer for the NLF. Hạnh played an important role in the NLF 1975 offensive to Saigon when he used his authority and influence to facilitate the bloodless surrender of the South Vietnam government. Hạnh's contribution to the NLF was recognized by the unified Socialist Republic of Vietnam and he was considered as a patriotic figure in the unified Vietnam.

Nguyễn Hữu Hạnh is the main character of the historical novel The Brigadier General of Nguyễn Trần Thiết.

Childhood
Nguyễn Hữu Hạnh was born on 26 July 1926 at Phú Phong, Châu Thành, Mỹ Tho province (now belong to Tiền Giang province), from a wealthy farmer family. His grandfather, Nguyễn Quang Phát, was a stoic and moral Confucian scholar. He refused to took part in the pro-French village governing body and committed suicide in 1947 at the age of 72, after being unjustly humiliated by a Moroccan French soldier. One of his parternal uncle, Nguyễn Tấn Thành, was a Communist, and took a vital role in converting Hạnh into a sympathizer of the National Liberation Front of South Vietnam. Nguyễn Hữu Hạnh did well in Math and was also a good learner of French. He finished his highschool study in the Collège de My Tho (now is the Nguyễn Đình Chiểu High School in Mỹ Tho City). After the August Revolution, Nguyễn Hữu Hạnh worked as a secretary for the regional Viet Minh branch in his homeland Mỹ Tho. However, Mỹ Tho was quickly overran by French army. Many people evacuated to other regions, including Hạnh to Saigon.

Service in the French Union Army and the armed forces of Saigon government
An unemployed Nguyễn Hữu Hạnh was proposed by a friend to join the French Union Army and Hạnh did so in 1946. He participated in Vũng Tàu Military School, became a subordinate and a close friend of Dương Văn Minh. Hạnh was promoted to the rank lieutenant and became a battalion commander. He was later promoted to major, 11th regiment commander, and at the end of 1954 he took over the Long Xuyên subzone after the French Army left. He became Dương Văn Minh's staff chief in early 1955 and took over the area of Rừng Sác, Chợ Lớn province, Gia Định, Tây Ninh and Saigon city. Under the command of Dương Văn Minh, Hạnh participated in several military campaigns in 1955–56 against the rebel forces of Hoà Hảo and Cao Đài. He took a 42 weeks training course at Fort Leaven Worth - Kansas in 1958, and an intelligence and strategy course at Fort Hollabird - Maryland in 1962. He was promoted to colonel in 1963 and appointed as staff chief of 4th Corps under the command of Huỳnh Văn Cao. He was promoted to brigadier general in 1969 and was appointed as vice-commander of 4th Corps and 2nd Corps.

Being close friend of Dương Văn Minh, Hạnh secretly took part in the November 1963 coup against Ngô Đình Diệm which Minh is a main participant. Hạnh assisted Nguyễn Hữu Có to capture the command headquarter of the 2nd Division and prevented the 4th Corps from rescued Diệm. Hạnh's military career suffered under the presidency of Nguyễn Văn Thiệu, who considered Dương Văn Minh and his associates as dangerous rivals. In 1972 he lost his position as corps vice-commander and was transferred to Đà Nẵng as the General Inspector of 1st Corps. He was forced to retire in May 1974 at the age of 48 under the rule of restriction military service to 20 years, a move suspected as Nguyễn Văn Thiệu's political purge against his political opponents.

Sympathizer and intelligence agent of the National Liberation Front of South Vietnam
Nguyễn Hữu Hạnh had a good relationship with his parternal uncle Nguyễn Văn Thành (also named as Tám) despite knowing Tám as a communist. When Tám was arrested during the purge against communism in 1956, Hạnh intervened to save Tám's life and released him shortly after. Via Tám, Hạnh contacted with the leftist ideas and became sympathized with socialism. Hạnh also sympathized with the National Liberation Front of South Vietnam (NLF), the Communist Party and North Vietnam's President Hồ Chí Minh who Hạnh considered as patriotic and respectable. On the other hand, Hạnh became dissatisfied with United States intervention in South Vietnam politics, which he considered as a gross violation of Vietnam's sovereignty. Hạnh was also upset with the brutality of the U.S. military campaigns in Vietnam.

A turning point of Hạnh's life occurred at the death of his father in October 1963. To fulfill his father's dying wish of being buried in his homeland - at the time under the control of NLF - Hạnh negiotated a ceasefire with the NLF and was allowed to organized his father's funeral there. The NLF also allowed Hạnh to visit and pay respect to his father's garves three days later. Hạnh's filial love attracted the attention of the NLF and he was consider a potential NLF sympathizer since then. Tám was assigned with the task to persuade Hạnh.

Nguyễn Hữu Hạnh finally agreed to work intelligence agent for the National Liberation Front under the pseudonym "Morning Star" and codename S7. Tám acted as the sole communicator between Hạnh and the NLF. To protect Hạnh's cover, the NLF did not assigned him any specific task. Nonetheless, Hạnh made use of his own authority to assist the NLF occasionally. Using the excuse of "caution", he refrained his troops from having aggressive actions against the NLF, forbade excessive use of firepower, and only allowed the helicopter to open fire to retaliate against enemy fire. He refused to execute the bombardment of Tháp Mười to avoid civilian casualties. During the fights against the NLF, Hạnh's troop only took part perfunctorily and retreated immedieately at the end of the battle. He then gained the nickname of "cautious commander" and "the commander who captures no target". Some of Hạnh's colleagues suspected him as a Communist sympathizer, but no evidences was found.

Hạnh rescued NLF sympathizers arrested by the Saigon authorities. He assisted in the release of Huỳnh Xuân, a NLF agent arrested in 1968 due to accusation of weapon smuggling. He took part in the anti-corruption campaigns and assisted the political opponents of Nguyễn Văn Thiệu. Via Tám, Hạnh provide several vital information related to the military activities of South Vietnam. He confirmed that the ARVN was unable to recover its losses at Battle of Phước Long. He informed that ARVN could be caught off-guuard at Buôn Mê Thuột and had no local reserves there. During the offensives of 1975, Hạnh encouraged the NLF's main corps to make rapid advances and left the liberated areas the local defense forces without the risk of being attacked at the rear. During the NLF's last offensive to Saigon, Hạnh advised the NLF to block all the roads to Saigon at the divisional level to facilitate the surrender Saigon government.

Hạnh received his first official mission in 1970, when he was tasked to participate in "the Third forces", a collection of politicians and social dignitaries who supported the unification of Vietnam and reconciliation with the National Liberation Front and North Vietnam. Specifically, Hạnh's target was his old friend Dương Văn Minh who also sympathized with the reconciliation ideas. However Hạnh's mission was temporarily disrupt with his relocation in 1972 and his forced retirement in 1974.

Role in the 1975 Ho Chi Minh Offensive
After the collapse of ARVN's defenses at Xuân Lộc and Phan Rang, the National Liberation Front closely approached Saigon and prepare for its final offensive in April 1975. On the other side, Dương Văn Minh was appointed as president on 28 April. Hạnh's mission related to Dương Văn Minh resumed. He was tasked to restore his influence on the ARVN, on Dương Văn Minh to encourage a bloodless surrender of the Saigon government. Hạnh hastily arrived Saigon on 28 April at meet Minh in the next morning. Minh appointed Hạnh as the assistant of Chief of Staff Nguyễn Phúc Vĩnh Lộc.

Hạnh made use of his authority to report the irredeemable situation of the ARVN to Minh, urged Minh to stop all the resistance. Hạnh also frustrated all the individual attempts to prolong the fight of the bitter military officers, and prevented the destruction of Đồng Nai bridge and other bridges lead to Saigon. He then order the Military Police to confiscate the weapons of lonely wandered soldiers and maintain strict sercurity in Saigon. On 30 April at 9:30 AM, Dương Văn Minh and Nguyễn Hữu Hạnh broadcast their announcements to drop all the resistance and ordered all ARVN soldiers and officers to follow suit. Nguyễn Hữu Hạnh also contacted general Nguyễn Khoa Nam, commander of 4th Corps at Mekong Delta, to obey the orders of Dương Văn Minh. Then Hạnh together with Minh and Minh's cabinet arrange the surrender of Saigon government to the National Liberation Front.

After 1975
The unified Socialist Republic of Vietnam recognized Nguyễn Hữu Hạnh's contribution to the National Liberation Front. Therefore, unlike other Saigon politicians and military officers, Hạnh was neither arrested nor sent to the rehabilitation center. He was recognized as a patriotic figure, was elected as the Secretary of People's Association for School Guardian and became a Committee Member of the Vietnamese Fatherland Front. He was awarded the Military Exploit Order, 1st rank, Bronze Wall Order, 3rd rank, and the Great National Unity Order. He also received visits from the government authorities and interviews about his contribution for the NLF during the war.

Nguyễn Hữu Hạnh died on 29 September 2019, aged 95.

References

External links
http://en.qdnd.vn/the-vietnam-war-file/a-former-saigon-regimes-general-full-of-ethics-and-patriotism/55378.html
Video Interview with Nguyen Huu Hanh, 1981

1926 births
2019 deaths
Army of the Republic of Vietnam generals
People from Tiền Giang province
South Vietnamese military personnel of the Vietnam War